Dastgāh is the standard musical system in Persian art music, standardised in the 19th century following the transition of Persian music from the Maqam modal system. A  consists of a collection of musical melodies, . In a song played in a given , a musician starts with an introductory , and then meanders through various different , evoking different moods. Many  in a given  are related to an equivalent musical mode in Western music. For example, most  in Dastgāh-e Māhur correspond to the Ionian mode in the Major scale, whilst most  in Dastgāh-e Šur correspond to the Phrygian mode.  In spite of 50 or more extant , 12 are most commonly played, with Dastgāh-e Šur and Dastgāh-e Māhur being referred to as the mothers of all .

Summary 
Each  consists of seven basic notes, plus several variable notes used for ornamentation and modulation. Each  is a certain modal variety subject to a course of development that is determined by the pre-established order of sequences, and revolves around 365 central nuclear melodies known as s (each of these melodies being a ), which musicians come to know through experience and absorption. This process of centonization is personal, and it is a tradition of great subtlety and depth. The full collection of s in all s is referred to as the radif. During the meeting of The Inter-governmental Committee for the Safeguarding of the Intangible Heritage of the United Nations, held between 28 September – 2 October 2009 in Abu Dhabi, radifs were officially registered on the UNESCO List of the Intangible Cultural Heritage of Humanity.

The system of twelve s and s has remained nearly the same as it was codified by the music masters of the nineteenth century, in particular Mîrzā Abdollāh Farāhāni (1843–1918). No new  or large  has been devised since that codification. From this remarkable stability one may infer that the system must have achieved "canonical" status in Iran.

Terminology 
The term  has often been compared to the musical mode in Western musicology, but this is inaccurate. A  is usually the name of the initial mode of a piece, which the music returns to—and moreover, a  identifies a group of modes grouped according to tradition.

According to musicians themselves, the etymology of the term  is associated with "the position of the hand [on the neck of the instrument]".

In conventional classifications of Persian music, Abū ʿAṭā, Daštī, Afšārī, and Bayāt-e Tork are considered sub-classes of Šur . Likewise, Bayāt-e Esfahān is a sub-class of Homāyun, reducing the number of principal  to a total of seven.

Distinguished pitches 

A  is more than a set of notes, and one component of the additional structure making up each  is which pitches are singled out for various musical functions. Examples include:
 Finalis, so named because it usually functions as the goal or destination tone that melodic cadences end on when they have a conclusory feel. This is also sometimes referred to as "tonic" but some authors avoid that usage because "tonic" is associated with Western tonality.
 Āghāz, meaning "beginning", the pitch on which an improvisation in a  usually begins. In some  it is different from the finalis while in others it is the same pitch.
 Ist ("stop"), a pitch other than the finalis which often serves as the ending note for phrases other than final cadences.
 Šāhed ("witness"), a particularly prominent pitch.
 Moteghayyer ("changeable"), a variable note – one that consistently appears as two distinct pitches, which can be used alternately in different contexts or at the performer's discretion.

The Seven Dastgahs

Most scholars divide the traditional Persian art music to seven s, although some divide them into 12 s (by counting Abu Ata, Dashti, Afshari, Bayat-e Kord and Bayat-e Esfahan as separate s rather than subcategories of other s). Those who categorize the traditional Persian art music into seven  often also list seven  (which means songs) in conjunction with these s. The following is a list of the seven s and seven s:

List of common Dastgah and Avaz
Listed in order as per the Radif_(music) of Mirza Abdollah. Flats are shown with a ׳b׳, and koron (half flats) are shown with a ׳p׳.

Shur شور (Ca Df Ep F G A/Apm Bb C)
Bayat-e-tork بیات ترک (Ca,i D Ep Ff,ŝ G A Bb C)
Dashti دشتی (C Df Eb Fa G A/Apm,ŝ Bb C)
Abu-ata ابوعطا (C Df Eba,i F Ga,ŝ Ap Bb/Bp C)
Afshari افشاری (Cf D Ebi F Ga,ŝ Ap/Am Bb C)
Segah سه‌گاه (C D/Dp Epa,f,ŝ F G Ap Bb C)
Nava نوا (C D Epi Fa Gf A Bb C)
Homayun همایون (C D Eba Fi Gf Apŝ B C)
Bayat-e-Esfahan (also called simply Esfahan) اصفهان (C D Epi F# Ga,f,ŝ A Bb C)
Chahargah چهارگاه (Cf Dp E F G Apa B C)
Mahur ماهور (Ca,f Dŝ E F G A B C)
Rast-Panjgah راست‌ پنجگاه (C D E Fa,f G A Bb C)

Less common:
Bayat-e-kord (C D Eb F G Ap Bb C) (Sometimes included as an Avaz under Shur)
Shushtar (Sometimes included as an Avaz under Homayun, but usually just as a gushe)
Note that in some cases the sub-classes (s) are counted as individual s, yet this contradicts technicalities in Iranian music.

See also
 Dastgah music
 Mugam
 Persian traditional music

References

Sources

Further reading
 Hormoz Farhat, The Dastgāh Concept in Persian Music (Cambridge University Press, 1990). ,  (first paperback edition, 2004). For a review of this book see: Stephen Blum, Ethnomusicology, Vol. 36, No. 3, Special Issue: Music and the Public Interest, pp. 422–425 (1992): JSTOR.
 Ella Zonis, Classical Persian Music: An Introduction (Harvard University Press, 1973)
 Lloyd Clifton Miller. 1995. Persian Music: A Study of Form and Content of Persian Avaz, Dastgah & Radif Dissertation. University of Utah.
 Bruno Nettl, The Radif of Persian Music: Studies of Structure and Cultural Context (Elephant & Cat, Champaign, 1987)
 Ella Zonis, Contemporary Art Music in Persia, The Musical Quarterly, Vol. 51, No. 4, pp. 636–648 (1965). JSTOR

External links
 The Dastgah system
 A sample of solo music on Setār by Master Ahmad Ebadi in the following Dastgahs: Segāh, Chahārgāh, Homāyoun, Esfahān, Afshāri.

Modes (music)
Persian classical music
Persian words and phrases